NXT is a brand of the American professional wrestling promotion WWE that was introduced on February 23, 2010. Brands are divisions of WWE's roster where wrestlers are assigned to perform on a weekly basis when a brand extension is in effect. Wrestlers assigned to NXT primarily appear on the brand's weekly television program, NXT. The brand serves as a developmental territory for WWE's two main brands, Raw and SmackDown, which are referred to as the main roster. Due to its status as the company's developmental territory, NXT operates regardless if there is a brand extension in effect or not.

In its original incarnation, NXT was a reality-based television show in which rookies competed to become a star in WWE. In 2012, NXT was relaunched as a separate brand and replaced the now-defunct Florida Championship Wrestling (FCW) as WWE's developmental territory. Primarily holding its events in the Orlando, Florida area since its relaunch, the brand would be expanded upon over time, having embarked on national and international tours. Wrestling critics and fans came to view NXT as its own distinct entity during this period, with the brand's shows being praised for their high-quality matches and storylines.

In September 2019, NXT's weekly television series was expanded to a two-hour format and moved to USA Network. The brand faced direct Nielsen ratings competition from All Elite Wrestling's flagship show, Dynamite, during this period as part of the "Wednesday Night Wars". In April 2021, NXT's television series moved to Tuesday nights, and the brand would relaunch under the "NXT 2.0" banner later that September, reinstituting its original function as a developmental territory. A year later, the brand would revert to its original "NXT" name.
 
In addition to NXT's main television program, the brand's wrestlers also appear on the supplementary show, Level Up. From 2014 to 2021, the brand held its major events under the NXT TakeOver series, but this event series was discontinued with the rebranding to NXT 2.0. WWE also operated a subsidiary brand under NXT called NXT UK, which was based in and produced for wrestlers in the United Kingdom; the brand is currently on hiatus and will relaunch in 2023 as NXT Europe to include all Pan-European countries. Another subsidiary brand, 205 Live, existed under NXT from 2019 until 2022 when 205 Live was dissolved.

History

Beginning 

NXT formed in 2010, following the dissolution of the ECW brand. Initially, a dispute occurred over the "NXT" trademark between WWE and Scotland's Scottish Wrestling Alliance (SWA), whose developmental division was called "NXT". WWE worked with SWA to secure the NXT trademark for their new series, and SWA renamed its developmental branch to "SWA: Source". In February 2010, WWE debuted the  NXT television program - it featured rookies from WWE's Tampa, Florida-based developmental territory Florida Championship Wrestling (FCW) competing to become members of WWE's main roster.

As a developmental territory 
In June 2012, WWE ceased operating FCW, and instead started running all of its developmental events and operations at Full Sail University under the NXT banner. The television show would also be revamped the same month to focus exclusively on developmental talent.

On February 27, 2014, NXT held a live, two-hour event, NXT Arrival, serving as the first live wrestling event for the newly launched WWE Network service. After the second live event in May 2014, NXT TakeOver, the "TakeOver" name would be used for future live NXT events airing on WWE Network. In March 2015, NXT promoted its first live event outside of Florida with an event in Columbus, Ohio. On August 22, 2015, NXT held its first TakeOver event outside of Full Sail University, with NXT TakeOver: Brooklyn at New York City's Barclays Center—acting as a support event for SummerSlam. In December of the same year, NXT held its first TakeOver event outside of the United States with NXT TakeOver: London. By 2016, NXT was running approximately 200 shows per year between the United States and overseas.

Bill DeMott controversy 
In late February and March 2015, several former NXT trainees previously working within WWE developmental system alleged misconduct by head trainer Bill DeMott, with Judas Devlin and Brandon Traven publicizing complaints which they claimed they had submitted to WWE management about DeMott back in March 2013 when they were still employed with WWE. Meanwhile, other ex trainees like Briley Pierce, Derrick Bateman and independent wrestler Terra Calaway also made allegations in 2015, while previous allegations made in 2013 by Chad Baxter and Chase Donovan were also noted. They accused DeMott of making trainees perform dangerous drills, physically assaulting and bullying trainees, using homophobic and racial slurs amongst other derogatory terms and condoning sexual harassment. WWE released statements regarding some of the claims that came to light in 2013 and 2015, saying that investigations were done and no wrongdoing was found. On March 6, 2015, DeMott denied the allegations, but resigned from WWE.

The Wednesday Night Wars 

On August 20, 2019, it was announced that the NXT television series would move to USA Network—the current broadcaster of WWE's flagship Monday Night Raw—and expand into a two-hour, live broadcast on Wednesday nights beginning September 18, 2019. The timing of the premiere coincided with SmackDowns move to FOX in October. As a result of the move, the show would compete with All Elite Wrestling (AEW)'s weekly show, Dynamite, on TNT; marking the beginning of the "Wednesday Night Wars".

On October 18, 2019, it was announced by Drake Maverick that NXT and the 205 Live brand and NXT would began a talent exchange. In an interview with VultureHound Magazine on September 12, executive producer Paul "Triple H" Levesque would confirm that both the 205 Live and NXT UK brands would essentially be subsidiaries to NXT, with their respective talents and personnel falling under the NXT banner.

On October 31, 2019, it was announced that NXT would take part in that year's Survivor Series, competing directly against Raw and SmackDown. In 2020, after winning that year's women's Royal Rumble match, Charlotte Flair chose to challenge Rhea Ripley for the NXT Women's Championship at WrestleMania 36, establishing that NXT championships were also options for Rumble winners to choose as they are guaranteed a world championship match of their choice at WrestleMania.

During this time period, some at NXT referred to the promotion as WWE's 'third brand', although many journalists still referred to NXT as developmental, with Raw and SmackDown viewed as WWE's "main roster". WWE wrestler Matt Riddle called NXT a "small ocean", while "when you get to the main roster you are in the ocean". Reflecting on the Wednesday Night Wars in a 2022 interview, Levesque said, "People put so much pressure on [this] 'competitive war'...it never was that. ... they beat our developmental system, good for them". This effectively retracted the view that NXT was one of their top three brands during that time.

Move to Tuesday nights 
The Wednesday Night Wars came to an end in April 2021 when NXT was moved to Tuesday nights. After 12 NXT wrestlers were released from their contracts that August, Dave Scherer and Mike Johnson of Pro Wrestling Insider reported there had been internal talks of major changes to the brand, such as: "a new logo, new lighting, a focus on younger talents and a different format to the TV shows." Dave Meltzer reported that NXT would likely go back to its developmental roots, with "talent that are [sic] younger, bigger and that could someday main event at WrestleMania". WWE President Nick Khan subsequently confirmed that NXT would undergo a "complete revamp" overseen by Levesque. However, due to undergoing heart surgery in September, Levesque stepped away from the brand and Shawn Michaels stepped in to oversee the creative aspect of the brand.

Dubbed NXT 2.0, the revamp began on the September 14 episode of NXT. WWE NXT and 205 Live would emanate from a fully redesigned venue at the WWE Performance Center to coincide with the revamp, dropping the "Capitol Wrestling Center" name. The NXT TakeOver series would also be discontinued, with that year's WarGames event being the brand's first PPV to not be held under the "TakeOver" name. Since its revamp, many of the NXT wrestlers were released en masse in November 2021 due to budget cuts and the ongoing COVID-19 pandemic that involved administrative staff, plant and wrestlers. This fractured further in January 2022, several backstage workers were released, most of them known for their work with Levesque, including NXT General Manager William Regal and writer Ryan Katz. On February 15, PWInsider reported that WWE was ceasing the production of 205 Live episodes, replacing the series with a new supplementary show for NXT called Level Up, which premiered on Peacock and the WWE Network on February 18.

Briefly in 2022, talents from NXT appeared on Monday Night Raw similar to the ECW talent exchange in 2007. Meltzer reported that Raw-NXT crossovers were a way to help boost the programs' ratings, since they both air on the USA Network.

In September 2022, Michaels was promoted to being Senior Vice President of Talent Development Creative, responsible for both creative and development at NXT, and for the expansion of NXT UK into NXT Europe in 2023. At the conclusion of the September 13, 2022 episode of NXT—which marked the one-year anniversary of the revamp—an updated logo for the brand was unveiled, dropping the "NXT 2.0" title and adopting a gold color scheme reminiscent of the original NXT branding.

In late-2022, after Triple H became chief content officer of WWE, NXT wrestlers began to increasingly make appearances on WWE's mid-card program Main Event. These crossovers came as part of efforts to increase the profile of NXT's talent, and evaluate their performances with members of WWE's main roster.

Championships and accomplishments

Current championships

Previous championships

Other accomplishment(s)

Television show 

The WWE Network was the main broadcaster of NXT's eponymous television program in the United States from 2014 to 2019. Regular episodes ran for one-hour and aired on tape delay, while live NXT TakeOver events were produced periodically. Beginning on May 17, 2012, WWE began filming NXT at Full Sail University in Winter Park, Florida, with the venue being billed on air as "Full Sail Live".

In its original format from 2010 to 2012, the series was a seasonally-broadcast competition series that was filmed in large venues during the SmackDown tapings. The series saw "NXT Rookies" paired with "WWE Pros", with the pairs competing in challenges until one sole winner remained. As with WWE's main programming, the series followed scripted storylines, where wrestlers portrayed heroes, villains, or less distinguishable characters that built tension and culminated in a series of matches or challenges. Results were predetermined by WWE's writers, while storylines were produced on the weekly series. Over the course of its five-season run, the winners of each season were Wade Barrett (Season 1), Kaval (Season 2), Kaitlyn (Season 3) and Johnny Curtis (Season 4). After NXT Redemption, the show's seasonal format was dropped.

Pay-per-view and WWE Network events

Notes

References

External links 

 
 

 
WWE brands
2012 establishments in the United States